Lian or Lien the Great was a figure in Chinese mythology. In the Records of the Grand Historian, Sima Qian's account of the origins of the House of Ying states that he was one of Fei the Great's two sons, along with Ruomu. He is said to be the great-great-grandfather of Mengxi and Zhongyan. His descendants ruled the State of Huang.

References

Characters in Chinese mythology
Xia dynasty people